XBlades is an Australian sports equipment manufacturing company engaged in the design, development and selling of products primarily related to footwear and clothing. The company was established in 1989 to make shoes for athletes who played rugby union and Australian rules football.

The company is the original creator of the bladed sole football boot, designed to minimize injury for athletes.

History 
XBlades was established by David Miers, a biomechanist who was listed with AFL club Collingwood in the 1980s. He suffered many knee injuries throughout his career, which he attributed to his studded boots, leading him to create a rubber-soled shoe with X-shaped 'blades' as an alternative.

In 2016, XBlades was acquired by former Callaway Golf director Leighton Richards and former AFL player Jimmy Bartel.

See also

List of fitness wear brands

References

External links
 

Australian companies established in 1989
Clothing brands of Australia
Sportswear brands
Sporting goods manufacturers of Australia
Multinational companies headquartered in Australia